Jean-Baptiste Migeon (1768-1845) was a French businessman and politician. He served in the Chamber of Deputies from 1827 to 1831, where he represented Haut-Rhin.

Early life
Jean-Baptiste Migeon was born on 15 October 1768 in Braux, France.

Career
Migeon was an ironmaster. He served as the Mayor of Mézières. He served in the Chamber of Deputies from 1827 to 1831, where he represented Haut-Rhin.

Death
Migeon died on 28 December 1845 in Paris.

References

1768 births
1845 deaths
People from Ardennes (department)
Mayors of places in Grand Est
Orléanists
Members of the Chamber of Deputies of the Bourbon Restoration
Members of the 1st Chamber of Deputies of the July Monarchy
French ironmasters
18th-century ironmasters
19th-century ironmasters